Megaplex Theatres is a chain of movie theaters headquartered in Sandy, Utah. The chain was founded in 1999 by Utah Jazz owner Larry H. Miller and is owned by the Larry H. Miller Company. Megaplex Theatres operates 15 locations in Utah and Nevada.

History
The first location anchored the newly built Jordan Commons restaurant and entertainment complex in  Sandy, opening on November 1, 1999 with 20 screens. The theater was built on the former site of Jordan High School. Since its opening, the Sandy location has grown to be one of the highest-grossing theaters locally while also ranking among the top theaters nationwide with some films. Jordan High School sat for over 100 years on this site but fell into disrepair and the local school district was unable to bring it up to code. Larry H. Miller developed the site at the request of Sandy's mayor.

In September 2005, the location in Sandy opened the second IMAX screen in Utah. Since then, Megaplex has added IMAX screens at locations in South Jordan, West Valley City, Centerville, and Vineyard.

In April 2012, the chain announced its expansion beyond the Wasatch Front with the purchase of 10 theaters from the Westates Theater chain. These include four locations in St. George, three in Logan, two in Cedar City, and one in Mesquite, Nevada.

In September 2013, the chain announced plans to build a new location in  Vineyard as part of a development on the former site of Geneva Steel. The theater has 13 screens including the chain's fifth IMAX auditorium. The location opened on March 13, 2015.

In 2019, Megaplex started offering a subscription service it called MegaPass. 

During the COVID pandemic Megaplex temporarily closed and then started limited screenings with social distancing. It also sold popcorn to go from the curb.

In 2020, Megaplex announced plans for construction of a theater in Idaho Falls, Idaho.

In 2021, Megaplex launched "Megaplex Luxury Theatres." Megaplex Luxury Theatres have heated luxury seats, in-seat dining, and private meeting space.

Due to the large Mormon population in Utah, Megaplex Theatres plays many faith-based films such as T.C. Christensen's The Fighting Preacher.

Larry H. Miller Company acquired  Swig in on the 22nd of November of 2022. Swig will start operating at Megaplex Theatres in 2023.

The Megaplex Theatres at The Gateway will serve as venue for the Sundance move festival in 2023.

Locations

References

External links

Movie theatre chains in the United States
Cinemas and movie theaters in Utah
1999 establishments in Utah
Companies based in Salt Lake County, Utah
Sandy, Utah